Pearl Rosary School, Serampore, West Bengal, India is a private school in the suburban regions of Kolkata, India. It is one of the first private schools in the region. It was founded in 1973 by the former principal Mrs. Ranjana Chakravorty. The school is an WBBSE affiliate.

Mrs. Ranjana Chakravorty is the principal. The school has many branches in the cities, like Bhadreswar, Chandannagar, Arambag, Dankuni, Serampore, Sheoraphully. The school is equipped with a computer lab and three science labs.

The school motto is "Manifesting the perfection of the future generation".

History 
The Pearl Rosary School was founded on 15 January 2007 by Mrs. Ranjana Chakravorty. It was one of the first private English Medium Schools in the region. The first building was erected in Serampore. The school started with five teachers and 30 students, and now has 90 teaching staff and 5000 students.

The second campus (called the Benepukur building) in the same region began in 2000 to make room for the growing number of students. In 2003, the school named Mr. Indranil Chatterjee as the vice-principal, Mr. Barun Bhandari as the Headmaster and Mrs. Rakhi as the Academic-in-charge.

In 2006, the school announced new independent campuses in further suburban regions of Janai and Haripal to cater to the poorer sections of the society. It has constructed another building in Raghunathpur, not far from Makhla, to host the ICSE and ISC exams. It was first named as Churchbell School, and would be later renamed to Binapani Teachers Training College.

About 
Dreamland School is affiliated to the CISCE, New Delhi, for ICSE (10) and ISC (12) with all the arrangements for Arts, Commerce and Science streams from Nursery to Class XII.

References

External links 
 

Private schools in West Bengal
Primary schools in West Bengal
High schools and secondary schools in West Bengal
Schools in Hooghly district
Educational institutions established in 1973
1973 establishments in West Bengal